Musée des Monuments français may refer to two separate museums in Paris: 
 the Musée des Monuments français (1795–1816) created by Alexandre Lenoir in the couvent des petits-Augustins to host sculptures and other objects salvaged from the destructions of the French Revolution; 
 the Musée national des Monuments Français, first opened in 1882 in the Palais du Trocadéro and since 2007 a part of the Cité de l'Architecture et du Patrimoine.